Tillie Olsen: A Heart in Action is a 2007 documentary film directed and produced by Ann Hershey on the life and literary influence of Tillie Olsen, the U.S. writer best known for the books Tell Me a Riddle (1961) and Yonnondio: From the Thirties (1974). The film includes extensive interviews with Olsen and with prominent fans of her work, including writers Alice Walker and Florence Howe and feminist political leader Gloria Steinem.

References

External links
Tillie Olsen: A Heart in Action web site
Women Make Movies

2007 films
Documentary films about women writers
American documentary films
2007 documentary films
2000s English-language films
2000s American films